La Masadera or Lamasadera is a locality located in the municipality of Sariñena, in Huesca province, Aragon, Spain. As of 2020, it has a population of 7.

Geography 
La Masadera is located 73km southeast of Huesca.

References

Populated places in the Province of Huesca